Klien is a surname. Notable people with the surname include:

Christian Klien (born 1983), Austrian racing driver
Erika Giovanna Klien (1900–1957), artist and art educator
Hermann Klien (born 1932), Austrian gymnast
Michael Klien (born 1973), choreographer and artist
Paula Klien, Brazilian artist
Walter Klien (1928–1991), Austrian pianist